Yawa may refer to:

Language
Yawa language (Papuan)
Yawa languages (Austronesian)
Gugu Yawa language, Australia
Yahua language, Amazon

People
Xolile Yawa
Yawa Hansen-Quao
Tōsanjin Yawa

Other
Yawa Yawa
YAWA, band